Territory Generation is a government owned corporation of the Northern Territory (Australia), established on 1 July 2014. It had previously been an operational business unit of Power and Water Corporation. Territory Generation owns and operates eight power stations in the Northern Territory.

Territory Generation traces its history back to the first power stations in the Northern Territory which were built in 1934 in Darwin and 1937 in Alice Springs.

Power stations
The Northern Territory does not have a single interconnected electricity transmission network. Territory Generation owns and operates eight power stations on five separate networks. Three of these are regulated by the Australian Energy Regulator and are managed by Power and Water Corporation.

Darwin–Katherine
Darwin and Katherine are on the largest regulated grid.
 Katherine Power Station
 Channel Island Power Station
 Weddell Power Station

Alice Springs
The Alice Springs grid is the second-largest regulated grid.
Ron Goodin Power Station
Owen Springs Power Station

Tennant Creek
The smallest regulated grid services the area around Tennant Creek.
 Tennant Creek Power Station

Kings Canyon
Kings Canyon Power Station is the only commercial source of electricity in the area of Kings Canyon. It provides up to 1.1MW from a combination of solar and diesel generation.

Yulara
Yulara Power Station services the town and locality  of Yulara, Northern Territory. It produces 11MW from natural gas and diesel backup.

References

Energy in the Northern Territory
2014 establishments in Australia
Government-owned companies of the Northern Territory